Ab Dilli Dur Nahin (Now Delhi is not far away) is a 1957 Indian Hindi-language film directed by Amar Kumar and written by Rajinder Singh Bedi and Muhafiz Hyder.

The film was produced by Raj Kapoor and starred Yakub, Anwar Hussain, Motilal, Nand Kishore and Jagdeep, and, in very minor role, Amjad Khan (Gabbar of Sholay).

Cast
 Romi as Ratan
 Sulochana as Bela 
 Yakub as Ghaseeta
 Anwar Hussain as Mukundlal
 Motilal as Hariram
 Nand Kishore
 Jagdeep as Masita
 Baij Sharma
 Amjad Khan as Lachhu 
 C.S. Dubey as Ram Bharose 
 Shivaji Rathore
 Om Prakash
 Manohar Gir
 Mohan Choti as Mithu
 Suraj Prakash
 Baby Chand
 Pappu
 Ghanshyam  (as Ghansham)
 Ram Kumar
 Chandan Mukherji
 Tillu
 Iftekhar as Inspector (as Iftikhar)
 Hari Shivdasani as Prosecuting Lawyer
 Nana Palsikar as Defending Lawyer
 Bhudo Advani  (as Budo Adwani)
 Bhupendra Kapoor as Guest Appearance (as Bhupendra Kapur)

Music
The music for Ab Dilli Dur Nahin was composed by Dattaram, the lyrics penned by Shailendra and Hasrat Jaipuri, including the popular song "Chun Chun Karti Aayi Chidiya".

Soundtrack
"Mata O Mata Jo Tu Aaj Hoti" - Sudha Malhotra
"Yeh Chaman Hamara Apna Hai" - Asha Bhosle, Geeta Dutt
"Raghupati Raghav Raja Ram Ramleela" - Shamshad Begum, Geeta Dutt, Asha Bhosle
"Chun Chun Karati Aai Chidiyaa" - Mohammed Rafi
"Jiyo Lal Mere Tum Lakho Baras" - Lata Mangeshkar
"Bhej Chhana Chhan" - Mohammed Rafi, S. Balbir
"Lo Har Chiz Lelo Zamane Ke Logo" - Geeta Dutt, Asha Bhosle
"Malik Tere Jahan Mein" - Sudha Malhotra

Release
The film premiered in 1957.

References

External links
 

1957 films
1950s Hindi-language films
Indian black-and-white films
Indian legal films
R. K. Films films
Indian films with live action and animation
Cultural depictions of Jawaharlal Nehru